Richard Izacke (16241698) of Devon was an antiquarian and lawyer who served as Chamberlain of the City of Exeter. His history, Antiquities of the City of Exeter, was first published in 1677.

Biography
Baptised on 8 February 1624 at Ottery St Mary, he was the eldest son of Samuel Izacke of Exeter, who was apparently a lawyer and member of the Inner Temple (1617).

On 20 April 1641, Izacke was admitted as commoner to Exeter College, Oxford, but left the University at the end of 1642 because of the Civil War. In November 1641 he entered the Inner Temple and was called to the bar in 1650. On 25 October 1653 he became Chamberlain of Exeter and on 15 December 1681 Town Clerk of Exeter. By his wife Katherine, of unknown family, he had children including Samuel Izacke (born 1663), who also became Chamberlain of Exeter and an antiquarian.

Izacke's father died in 1681 or 1682 and according to his will, Richard had behaved badly towards him by "his disobedience in his marriage". Despite this he bequeathed him a house in Holy Trinity parish, Exeter and leasehold property in Tipton, Ottery St. Mary, on the condition that he behaved well towards his stepmother, brothers, and sisters in the future.

Izacke was buried in Ottery St Mary parish church on 18 March 1698.

Works
As Chamberlain of Exeter, Izacke could access the city's archives and using these resources he produced a manuscript history of the city, dedicating it to the city's corporation in 1665. The history was first published in London in 1677 as Antiquities of the City of Exeter. Later editions were undertaken by his son Samuel, and had greatly expanded titles.

The largest section of the first edition consists of 180 pages of "Memorials": short descriptions of events related to Exeter, ordered by year from 1200 to 1676. Research has shown that the entries up to 1590 were substantially copied from a manuscript chronicle in the city archives that had been written by John Hooker, the first Chamberlain of Exeter, who had died in 1601. Izacke's unacknowledged and sometimes inaccurate plagiarism of Hooker's work, as well as the errors that he himself made, have caused his History to be subjected to much criticism.

However, despite its faults, the book was republished seven times up to 1757. After a reprint of the first edition in 1681, there was a gap of over forty years before the second edition was published by Izacke's son Samuel. Following this there were five more reissues, all with unchanged text, but slightly different title pages.

Izacke's manuscript history of 1665 provided the content for another book, first published in 1736 by his grandson (also named Samuel). This was about legacies left to the poor. Four further editions were published under various titles, the last in 1820.

Published editions
Izacke, Richard, (improved and continued to the year 1724 by Samuel Izacke), Remarkable Antiquities of the City of Exeter, 3rd Edition, London, 1731

Notes

References

Further reading
 A transcription of John Hooker's and Richard Izacke's manuscript copies of their histories, and Samuel Izacke's (and Richard Crossing's) printed copies.

1624 births
Place of birth unknown
1698 deaths
Place of death unknown
17th-century English writers
17th-century English male writers
Alumni of Exeter College, Oxford
English antiquarians
Lawyers from Devon